Wenceslao "Peewee" Bayona Trinidad (August 18, 1933 – March 4, 2016) was a Filipino lawyer who served as the Mayor of Pasay from April 2000 up to June 2010. He previously served as a member of the Pasay City Council from 1963 to 1967.

Background 
Wenceslao "Peewee" B. Trinidad was born on August 18, 1933 in Pasay.

Trinidad started his political career when he was elected as councilor in 1964. He was elected three times for the same post.

He was elected as a Vice Mayor from 1980 to 1986 and from 1992 to 1997.

In 1997, he took over the reigns of government from an ailing Mayor Pablo Cuneta.

In 2000, due to the failing health of then-Mayor Jovito Claudio, a recall election was commenced, and he won.

Trinidad served for four terms, from 2000 to 2001 (recall election), 2001–2004, 2004–2007 (suspended between September 2006 and May 2007), and 2007–2010.

He ran for another term in 2010, but he lost to Vice Mayor Antonino Calixto. He ran again in 2013 but lost to Calixto once again.

He died on March 4, 2016, at the age of 82.

He was the father of 2019 mayoral candidate Jon Wilfred "JT" Trinidad and Miki Trinidad (who ran for councilor in 2019 and in 2022), and cousin of former Councilor Noel "Onie" Bayona (who ran for Vice Mayor in 2010).

References

1933 births
2016 deaths
Mayors of Pasay
Filipino city and municipal councilors
20th-century Filipino lawyers
People from Pasay
Nacionalista Party politicians
Laban ng Demokratikong Pilipino politicians